Ted Talbert (1942 – January 22, 2013) was an American journalist, documentary-maker and historian. Talbert was born and raised in Royal Oak Township and attended Northern High School in Detroit, Michigan.

Career
In his career, as a writer, he served as an advisor for the Detroit Free Press sportswriters about black African-American Detroit. Talbert was a close friend of Carolyn Franklin, and had a good friendship with Detroit's former mayor Coleman Young.

Personal life
Talbert won five Emmy Awards for his work. In 2000, he was inducted as an official member of the Michigan Journalism Hall of Fame.

Death
He died on January 22, 2013, of a heart attack at his home and is survived by daughter Jamile Skinner, son Ted Talbert, four grandchildren, and a sister.

References

External links

1942 births
2013 deaths
American male journalists
Journalists from Michigan
Detroit Free Press people
Northern High School (Detroit, Michigan) alumni
Writers from Detroit